Förthof UHK Krems is a handball club from Krems an der Donau, Austria. They currently compete in the Handball Liga Austria.

History 

In 1947 the UHK Krems was founded as the handball section of Union Krems. It has always been in the Austrian First Division since the 2002/2003 season.
They won the championship 5 times (1973, 1975, 1977, 2019, 2022), they were cup winners 5 times (1973, 1975, 1978, 2010, 2019).

Crest, colours, supporters

Club crest

Kit manufacturers

Kits

Sports Hall information

Arena: – Sporthalle Krems
City: – Krems an der Donau
Capacity: – 1500
Address: –  Strandbadstraße 3, 3500 Krems an der Donau, Austria

Management

Team

Current squad 

Squad for the 2022–23 season

Technical staff
 Head coach:  Ibish Thaqi
 Assistant coach:  Jörg Merten
 Physiotherapist:  Claudia Nachtnebel

Transfers
Transfers for the 2022–23 season

Joining 
  Thomas Eichberger (GK) from  ThSV Eisenach
  Daniel Dicker (LB) from  ThSV Eisenach
  Julian Pratschner (LW) from  WAT Fünfhaus

Leaving 
  Jakob Jochmann (CB) (retires)
  Fabian Posch (LP) to  JAGS Vöslau
  Igor Vuckovic (LB) to  TV 08 Willstätt
  Gašper Hrastnik (RB) to  RD Ribnica

Previous Squads

Titles 

 Handball Liga Austria
 Winner (5) : 1973, 1975, 1977, 2019, 2022
 Austrian Cup
 Winner (5) : 1979, 1980, 1984, 2010, 2019

In the 1978/79, 1979/80 and 1983/84 seasons, the UHK Krems was automatically Austrian Cup winner as runner-up in the championship and qualified for the international cup winner competition.

EHF ranking

Former club members

Notable former players

  Ivica Belas (2008–2016)
  Daniel Dicker (2022–)
  Thomas Eichberger (2022–)
  Sebastian Feichtinger (2021–)
  Wolfgang Filzwieser (2008–2013)
  Jakob Jochmann (2017–2022)
  Thomas Kandolf (2018–2020)
  Romas Kirveliavičius (2021–)
  Werner Lint (2008–2014)
  Christoph Neuhold (2013–2016)
  Fabian Posch (2016–2022)
  Julian Pratschner (2022–)
  Tobias Schopf (2005–2018)
  Ibish Thaqi (2005–2006, 2007-2009)
  Kristof Vizvary (2008–2013, 2014-2016)
  Gerald Zeiner (2005–2009)
  Ivan Vukas (2009–2011)
  Gábor Hajdú (2018–)
  Norbert Visy (2009–2018)
  Gerdas Babarskas (2012–2015)
  Petar Angelov (2018)
  Vlatko Mitkov (2012–2018)
  Aleksandar Glendža (2020)
  Michal Shejbal (2012–2016, 2018-2020)

Former coaches

References

External links
 
 

Austrian handball clubs